Middelthon is a surname. Notable people with the surname include:

Carsten Middelthon (1916–2005), Norwegian journalist and translator
Cornelius Middelthon (1869–1934), Norwegian grocer and politician